The 54th National Film Awards, presented by Directorate of Film Festivals, the organisation set up by Ministry of Information and Broadcasting, India to felicitate the best of Indian Cinema released in the year 2006.

Three different committees were instituted in order to judge the various entries for feature film, non-feature film and best writing on cinema sections; headed by National award winner director, Buddhadeb Dasgupta, for feature films and K. Bikram Singh along with Madhu Jain for Non-feature films and best writing on cinema sections, respectively.

Each chairperson announced the award on 10 June 2008 for their respective sections and award ceremony took place at Vigyan Bhavan, New Delhi with President of India, Pratibha Patil giving away the awards on 2 September 2008.

Awards 

Awards were divided into feature films, non-feature films and books written on Indian cinema.

Lifetime Achievement Award 

Along with Dadasaheb Phalke Award, another one special lifetime achievement award was also given to commemorate the 60th year of Indian Independence. Award was given to veteran actors, Dilip Kumar and B. Saroja Devi along with Lata Mangeshkar. Incidentally, Lata Mangeshkar and Dilip Kumar were already awarded with Dadasaheb Phalke Award for their contribution to Indian cinema at the 37th and 42nd National Film Awards respectively.

Feature films 

Films made in any Indian language shot on 16 mm, 35 mm or in a wider gauge or digital format but released on a film format or video/digital but certified by the Central Board of Film Certification as a feature film or featurette are eligible for Feature Film section.

Feature films were awarded at All India as well as regional level. For 54th National Film Awards, a Malayalam film, Pulijanmam won the National Film Award for Best Feature Film; whereas a Konkani film, Antarnad along with a Hindi film, Lage Raho Munna Bhai and a Punjab film, Waris Shah: Ishq Daa Waaris won the maximum number of awards (4). Following were the awards given in each category:

Juries 

A committee headed by Buddhadeb Dasgupta was appointed to evaluate the feature films awards. Following were the jury members:

 Jury Members
 Buddhadeb Dasgupta (Chairperson)Rahul DholakiaP. SheshadriRatnottama SenguptaSekhar DasSiva Shankari
 Sharada RamanathanHari KumarN. Krishna Kumar (Unni)Himanshu KhatuaMeenakshi SheddeSharad DuttAshok Rane

All India Award 

Following were the awards given:

Golden Lotus Award 

Official Name: Swarna Kamal

All the awardees are awarded with 'Golden Lotus Award (Swarna Kamal)', a certificate and cash prize.

Silver Lotus Award 

Official Name: Rajat Kamal

All the awardees are awarded with 'Silver Lotus Award (Rajat Kamal)', a certificate and cash prize.

Regional Awards 

The award is given to best film in the regional languages in India.

Best Feature Film in Each of the Language Other Than Those Specified In the Schedule VIII of the Constitution

Non-Feature Films 

Films made in any Indian language shot on 16 mm, 35 mm or in a wider gauge or digital format and released on either film format or video/digital but certified by the Central Board of Film Certification as a documentary/newsreel/fiction are eligible for non-feature film section.

Juries 

A committee headed by K. Bikram Singh was appointed to evaluate the non-feature films awards. Following were the jury members:

 Jury Members
 K. Bikram Singh (Chairperson)Arvind SinhaApurba SarmaBiyot Projna TripathiSatheesh VenganoorIftikhar Ahmed

Golden Lotus Award 

Official Name: Swarna Kamal

All the awardees are awarded with 'Golden Lotus Award (Swarna Kamal)', a certificate and cash prize.

Silver Lotus Award 

Official Name: Rajat Kamal

All the awardees are awarded with 'Silver Lotus Award (Rajat Kamal)' and cash prize.

Best Writing on Cinema 

The awards aim at encouraging study and appreciation of cinema as an art form and dissemination of information and critical appreciation of this art-form through publication of books, articles, reviews etc.

Juries 

A committee headed by Madhu Jain was appointed to evaluate the writing on Indian cinema. Following were the jury members:

 Jury Members
 Madhu Jain (Chairperson)Rashmi DoraiswamyVasiraju Prakasam

Golden Lotus Award 
Official Name: Swarna Kamal

All the awardees are awarded with 'Golden Lotus Award (Swarna Kamal)' and cash prize.

Special Mention 

All the award winners are awarded with Certificate of Merit.

Awards not given 

Following were the awards not given as no film was found to be suitable for the award:

 Best Feature Film in Manipuri
 Best Anthropological / Ethnographic Film
 Best Exploration / Adventure Film
 Best Non-Feature Film on Family Welfare
 Best Historical Reconstruction/Compilation Film

References

External links 
 National Film Awards Archives
 Official Page for Directorate of Film Festivals, India

National Film Awards (India) ceremonies
2008 Indian film awards